Singles 1–12 is a compilation album by Melvins which was released in 1997 through Amphetamine Reptile Records. In 1996, The Melvins had released a 7 inch single each month on Amphetamine Reptile Records, each limited to 800 copies worldwide. This 1997 compilation contains all of these singles.

In January, Melvins played a series of three shows at Club Spaceland. A special handmade digipak edition of album was sold here, limited to 50 copies.

Track listing (disc one)

All songs written by The Melvins except where noted. (Song descriptions from CD liner notes)

Track listing (disc two)
All songs written by The Melvins except where noted. (Song descriptions from CD liner notes)

Personnel

Buzz Osborne – guitar, vocals, misc.
Dale Crover – drums, vocals, misc.
Mark Deutrom – bass, vocals, misc.

Additional personnel
Lori Black – bass (disc 1, tracks 7–8)
Matt Lukin – bass (disc 1, track 10)
Mike Dillard – drums (disc 1, track 10)
Wayne Kramer – guitar, vocals (disc 2, track 1)
Sean Lennon (disc 2, track 10)
Timo Ellis (disc 2, track 10)
Sam Koppelman (disc 2, track 10)
Rich Hoak – drums (disc 2, track 12)
Dan Lilker – bass (disc 2, track 12)
Brent McCarty – guitar (disc 2, track 12)
Kevin Sharp – vocals (disc 2, track 12)

References

Melvins compilation albums
1997 compilation albums
Amphetamine Reptile Records compilation albums